René Théophile "Phil" Nuytten, (born August 13, 1941) is a Canadian entrepreneur, deep-ocean explorer, scientist, inventor of the Newtsuit, and founder of Nuytco Research Ltd.

He has pioneered designs related to diving equipment, and has worked with NASA for more than 25 years on applications related to undersea and space technologies.

Today, his equipment is used by a wide range of organizations, including the National Geographic Society, NASA, and is standard for almost a dozen navies.

Early life
Nuytten was born in Vancouver, British Columbia, and is a Métis. He was subsequently formally adopted into the Kwakiutl nation. While still in his teens, he began to design diving gear, and opened the first dive shop in Western Canada.

Career
Nuytten has worked in numerous countries as a commercial diver. In his work for the commercial, scientific, and military industries, he has developed equipment and deep-water diving, and technical diving techniques.

During the 1960s and 1970s, Nuytten was involved in the development of mixed-gas decompression tables. He was part of a team that accomplished the first 600 FSW (feet of seawater) ocean "bounce" dives on Project Nesco.

In the 1970s, he co-founded Oceaneering International, Inc.  This company became one of the largest underwater skills companies in the world.

In 1983, Nuytten appeared on the cover of National Geographic Magazine due to his dives into arctic waters to HMS Breadalbane.

Media appearances

Print
Resulting from his contributions to marine diving technologies, Nuytten has appeared in the media numerous times, including: National Geographic Magazine, Time, Newsweek, Popular Science, Discovery, Fortune, Scientific American and Business Week.

Film and television
For twenty years, Nuytten has been featured in, and worked on the production of films and television programs based on technology he developed, such as:

Descent of Man (CBC)
Mysteries of the Sea (NBC)
Pressure Point (Walt Disney)
[Pacific Abyss] (BBC)
 [Jaws of Death]  (Bruce Martin Productions)
 [Octopus Hunt]  National Film Board of Canada)
  [28 Above, Below]  (National Film Board of Canada
  [D Day, Underwater]  (Discovery Channel)

Nuytten provided the submersibles and was the senior technical advisor for the film The Abyss. His Newtsuit is featured in the IMAX movie Flight of the Aquanaut.

Newtsuit

In 1979, Nuytten started work on the Newtsuit, a one-atmosphere diving suit. The revolutionary new design features fully articulated rotary joints. This patented breakthrough design is now used in many subsequent atmospheric diving suits.

Exosuit
In 2000, Nuytten announced that he is developing a new type ultra lightweight powered exoskeleton called the Exosuit This new design is being considered for use as a submarine escape device by the Canadian Department of Defense.

Vent-Base Alpha 
It was announced in September 2018 that Nuytten was designing and planned to build an underwater human settlement off of the coast of Vancouver, Canada in the Pacific Ocean. A prototype is to be built as early as 2019, with cylindrical living chambers that are powered from Stirling engines powered by hydrothermal vent sources. The buildings would be built on land and transported likely to the Juan de Fuca Strait, and submerged a few thousand feet below the surface.

Awards and commendations
Academy of Underwater Arts and Sciences (Hall of Fame membership)
American Association of Aeronautics and Astronautics
American Institute of Aeronautics and Astronautics (Life Sciences Award)
Canadian Advanced Technology Award
Canadian Award for Business Excellence
Contractors International’s Commercial Diving (Hall of Fame membership)
Diving Association of Diving Contractors
Diving Hall of Fame (induction)
Explorers Club (Lowell Thomas award in 2000)
John Galletti Memorial Award
Jules Verne Award
Order of British Columbia
Simon Fraser University (honorary Doctor of Laws degree)
Order of Canada (2017)

See also
 Technical diving
 Scuba diving

References

External links
 Image of Phil Nuytten
 Image and specifications of the Exosuit

1941 births
Living people
Canadian male divers
Canadian Métis people
Canadian inventors
Sportspeople from Vancouver
Members of the Order of British Columbia
Officers of the Order of Canada